Galina is a given name.

Galina may also refer to:
Galina (Austria), a river in Austria
Galina, Perm Krai, a village in Kudymkarsky District, Russia
3576 Galina, an asteroid
Galina Lighthouse, a lighthouse in Jamaica

Persons with surname
Stacy Galina (born 1966), American actress
Roberto Vega Galina, Mexican physician and labour leader

See also
Galena (disambiguation)